A Dead letter is mail that can neither be delivered nor returned to sender - see Dead letter mail

It can also refer to:

 Dead letter law, a type of unenforced law

Film and television
 The Dead Letter, a 1915 American silent comedy film starring Oliver Hardy
 Dead Letters (film), a 2007 American film
 "Dead Letter" (Murder, She Wrote), a 1989 television episode
 "Dead Letters" (Millennium), a 1996 television episode

Music
 Dead Letters, an album by the Rasmus, 2003
 "Dead Letter", a song by Angelspit from Krankhaus, 2006
 "Dead Letters", a song by Katatonia from Dead End Kings, 2012

See also

 Letter (disambiguation)
 Dead (disambiguation)